Little Brown Creek is a  long 3rd order tributary to Brown Creek in Anson County, North Carolina.  This creek is located on the left bank of Brown Creek and is different than the one on the right bank located downstream.

Course
Little Brown Creek rises about 8 miles south of Marshville, North Carolina.  Little Brown Creek then flows southeast to meet Brown Creek about 8 miles south-southeast of Marshville, North Carolina.

Watershed
Little Brown Creek drains  of area, receives about 48.4 in/year of precipitation, has a topographic wetness index of 426.99 and is about 42% forested.

References

Rivers of North Carolina
Rivers of Anson County, North Carolina
Tributaries of the Pee Dee River